"Someday When Things Are Good' is a song co-written and recorded by American country music artist Merle Haggard.  It was released in March 1984 as the third single from his album That's the Way Love Goes.  The song was Haggard's thirty-first number one country single as a solo artist.  The single went to number one for one week and spent a total of thirteen weeks on the country chart.  Haggard wrote the song with then-wife Leona Williams.

Personnel
Merle Haggard– vocals, guitar, fiddle

The Strangers:
Roy Nichols – guitar
Norm Hamlet – steel guitar
Tiny Moore – fiddle, mandolin
Mark Yeary – keyboards
Dennis Hromek – bass
Biff Adams – drums
Jimmy Belken – fiddle
Don Markham – horns

Charts

Weekly charts

Year-end charts

References
 

1984 singles
Merle Haggard songs
Songs written by Merle Haggard
Song recordings produced by Ray Baker (music producer)
Epic Records singles
Songs written by Leona Williams
1984 songs